Anandabazar Patrika (Bengali: আনন্দবাজার পত্রিকা) is an Indian Bengali-language daily newspaper owned by the ABP Group. Its main competitors are Bartaman, Ei Samay, and Sangbad Pratidin.

History
A Bengali newspaper was published in 1876 in a small village of Magura at Jessore District in British India (now Bangladesh) by Tushar Kanti Ghosh and his father Sisir Kumar Ghosh. They named it Ananda Bazar after Tusharkanti's grandmother's sister Anandomayee. However, soon the newspaper died. In 1886, Ghosh published another newspaper, named after his grandmother Amritamoyee: Amrita Bazar Patrika.

Later in 1922, the Anandabazar Patrika was relaunched by proprietor Suresh Chandra Majumdar and editor Prafulla Kumar Sarkar. It was first printed on 13 March 1922 under their ownership and was against British rule. In 1922 it first published as a four-page evening daily. The first colour printing was the features section. The internet edition of the newspaper was launched in 2001, which publishes news among the community. Also provides advertisement in the printed newspaper. In 2010, Time Inc. entered into a license agreement with ABP Group to publish Fortune India magazine. This magazine publishes the Fortune India 500 list every year.

See also
 List of newspapers in India by circulation
 List of newspapers in the world by circulation

References

External links
  
 

 

ABP Group
Daily newspapers published in India
Newspapers published in Kolkata
Bengali-language newspapers published in India
Newspapers established in 1922
1922 establishments in India
Newspapers owned by Patrika Group